Desert Vigilante is a 1949 American Western film directed by Fred F. Sears and written by Earle Snell. The film stars Charles Starrett, Peggy Stewart, Tris Coffin, Mary Newton, George Chesebro and Smiley Burnette. The film was released on April 9, 1949, by Columbia Pictures.

Plot

Cast          
Charles Starrett as Steve Wood / The Durango Kid
Peggy Stewart as Betty Long
Tris Coffin as Thomas Hadley
Mary Newton as Angel
George Chesebro as Bill Martin
Smiley Burnette as Smiley Burnette 
Paul Campbell as Bob Gill
Tex Harding as Jim Gill
Jack Ingram as Sergeant
I. Stanford Jolley as Heavy

References

External links
 

1949 films
American Western (genre) films
1949 Western (genre) films
Columbia Pictures films
Films directed by Fred F. Sears
American black-and-white films
1940s English-language films
1940s American films